Acacia barrettiorum, commonly known as the Barrett's wattle, is a shrub of the genus Acacia and the subgenus Plurinerves. It is native to an area in the Kimberley  region of Western Australia.

Description
Like most species of Acacia it has phyllodes rather than true leaves. The crowded, patent and evergreen phyllodes have a triangular to oblong-triangular shape with a broad base.

Taxonomy
The species was first formally described by the botanists Margaret Lewington and Bruce Maslin in 2009 as part of the work Three new species of Acacia (Leguminosae: Mimosoideae) from the Kimberley Region, Western Australia as published in the journal Nuytsia. The type specimen was collected by Matthew David Barrett and Russell Lindsay Barrett, and both the common name and the species epithet honour them.

Distribution
The range of the plant is entirely within Prince Regent Nature Reserve, in the Northern Kimberley region of Western Australia where two small disjunct populations are known. The shrub is often situated near creeks in fire-protected areas growing in shallow sandy soils over and around sandstone as a part of low shrubland communities featuring spinifex.

See also
List of Acacia species

References

barrettiorum
Acacias of Western Australia
Plants described in 2009
Taxa named by Bruce Maslin